Udarny is an urban locality (a work settlement) in Prikubansky District of the Karachay-Cherkess Republic, Russia. As of the 2010 Census, its population was 1,083.

History
It was established in 1961 and granted urban-type settlement status in 1965.

Administrative and municipal status
Within the framework of administrative divisions, the work settlement of Udarny is subordinated to Prikubansky District. As a municipal division, Udarny is incorporated within Prikubansky Municipal District as Udarnenskoye Urban Settlement.

References

Notes

Sources

Urban-type settlements in the Karachay-Cherkess Republic